K1000 may refer to:

 K-1000 headphones by AKG Acoustics
 Soviet K-1000 battleship
 K1000 keyboard and music software by Kurzweil Music Systems
 Pentax K1000, Pentax Camera